Sab-e Agotay-e Olya (also Romanized as Sab‘-e Āgotāy-e ‘Olyā; also known as Sab‘-e Gatā‘, Sab‘-e Gatā-e ‘Olyā, Sab‘-e Goţā‘-e Bālā, Sab‘-e Goţā‘-e ‘Olyā, and Soba‘ Geţā‘) is a village in Abdoliyeh-ye Sharqi Rural District, in the Central District of Ramshir County, Khuzestan Province, Iran. At the 2006 census, its population was 263, in 44 families.

References 

Populated places in Ramshir County